Adonis Mashhad was an Iranian football club based in Mashhad, Khorasan. They played in the Iranian Second Division during 1999–00 season. The team was sponsored and owned by Adonis MFG Co Ltd. This was the club that Persian Gulf Pro League all-time record goalscorer Reza Enayati played for in his youth.

Managers
 Hossein Fekri

Famous players
 Reza Enayati

References
RSSSF Page on 1999/00 League

Defunct football clubs in Iran
Sport in Mashhad